Claude Cropton Fleck (11 June 1889 – 23 July 1962) was an Australian politician.

He was born in Sydney to carpenter James William Fleck and Isabella Ellen, née McFarlane. He attended Cleveland Street Boys' High School before being apprenticed to a chemist; he was a registered pharmacist by 1910 and studied at the University of Sydney for his Bachelor of Medicine and Master of Surgery (1923). In 1923 he married Aime Isabel Hinder, with whom he had a son. From 1926 to 1941 he served on Granville Council (mayor 1939–41). He served in the New South Wales Legislative Assembly from 1932 to 1938 as the United Australia Party member for Granville. In 1939 he married Dorothy Isabel Hinder, and on 12 July 1952 he married Mary Cunninghame. Fleck died at Chatswood in 1962.

References

 

1889 births
1962 deaths
United Australia Party members of the Parliament of New South Wales
Members of the New South Wales Legislative Assembly
Politicians from Sydney
Mayors of places in New South Wales
University of Sydney alumni
20th-century Australian politicians